Jack Hobson Leverett III (born January 18, 2000) is an American sport shooter. He has qualified to represent the United States at the 2020 Summer Olympics. He is the older brother of Henry Leverett who is also a sport shooter.

References

2000 births
Living people
American male sport shooters
Olympic shooters of the United States
Shooters at the 2020 Summer Olympics
People from Bainbridge, Georgia
Pan American Games competitors for the United States
Shooters at the 2019 Pan American Games